Joseph Kalite (died 24 January 2014) was a Central African politician. As a government minister he either held the housing or health portfolio. Kalite, a Muslim, was reported to be killed by anti-balaka outside the Central Mosque in the capital Bangui during the Central African Republic conflict. He was killed with machetes on the day in Bangui after interim president Catherine Samba-Panza took power. At the time of the attack Kalite held no government position, nor did he under the Séléka rule. He was reported to have supported the rule of Séléka leader Michel Djotodia.

References

Year of birth missing
2014 deaths
People murdered in the Central African Republic
Central African Republic murder victims
Deaths by blade weapons
Central African Republic Muslims
Government ministers of the Central African Republic
Assassinated Central African Republic politicians 
People of the Central African Republic Civil War